Muskego High School is a comprehensive secondary school located in Muskego, Wisconsin.  The school, administered by the Muskego-Norway School District, lies in southeast Waukesha County, in southeast Wisconsin. The district stretches through the city of Muskego and nearby Norway in Racine County.

History 
Muskego High School was constructed in 1956 at the corner of Woods Road and Racine Ave. Its first elected administrator, Arnold Wicklund, oversaw the school's construction. Prior to the school's construction, many Muskego children attended school in the Milwaukee School District.

In September 2003 the high school was completely remodeled, with  added to the building. Facilities that were added include several wings and a performing arts center. A controversial portion of the remodel was the addition of eight 42" flat screen TVs for the cafeteria, and the incorrect placement of the supporting wall of the South Gym, which prevents the bleachers from being able to be pulled out entirely during sporting events.

In April 2016, a referendum was passed to add a new artificial turf field to the nearby, district owned stadium, Inpro Field. Along with this referendum, a new set of bleachers and press box were added to the West side of Inpro Field. On the south side of Inpro Field there was a concession stand added with restrooms and the ticket booths. Most of the field was made possible by the Inpro Corporation, with donations from the Muskego Grid Iron Club (booster club) and fundraising in the community of Muskego.

Academics 
Transcribed credit courses are offered, which allow students to take classes at the high school while receiving credit at Waukesha County Technical College. Students may participate in the School-To-Work program, which gives students an opportunity to earn classroom credit, gain work experience and get paid at the same time.  Muskego also allows students to take Advanced Placement (AP) courses.  Students can earn college credit if they pass the AP College Board exam near the end of the school year.  Muskego currently has AP courses in many different subject areas, including: 
United States History
European History
English Language and Composition
English Literature and Composition
Biology
Calculus AB
Calculus BC
Physics B
Psychology
Spanish Language and Culture
French Language and Culture
German Language and Culture
Music Theory
American Government and Politics
Gender Studies

Muskego High School also participated in the University of Wisconsin-Oshkosh C.A.P.P. Program.

Athletics 
Muskego High School is a part of the WIAA Classic 8 conference. The Muskego Warriors have 23 sports with over 90 teams. Muskego High School offers the following athletics:

Baseball, basketball, cheerleading, cross country, downhill ski racing, football, golf, gymnastics, soccer, softball, swimming, tennis, track and field, volleyball, wrestling, pon pom.

In 2018 the Muskego High School Summer Baseball team, Girls Soccer, Girls Cross Country, Gymnastics, Pon Pom, and Football team won WIAA Division 1 State Championships.

In 2018, the Warriors Football Program won the first state title in school history. Then repeated that reign for the next two years. 

Many other athletic programs have won conference champions, regional champions, sectional champions, state runner-ups, and state championships in the past few years.

References

External links 
 Muskego High School - Muskego High School website
 Muskego Warriors football

Public high schools in Wisconsin
Schools in Waukesha County, Wisconsin
Educational institutions established in 1956
1956 establishments in Wisconsin